Gumeracha was an electoral district of the House of Assembly in the Australian state of South Australia from 1857 to 1902 and again from 1938 to 1970.

Gumeracha's most historic MPs were Thomas Playford II and Thomas Playford IV. IV served continuously as Premier of South Australia from 5 November 1938 to 10 March 1965, the longest term of any elected government leader in the history of Australia, albeit with the assistance of the Playmander.

The town of Gumeracha is currently represented by the safe Liberal seat of Morialta, having previously been in Kavel.

Members

Election results

References 

Former electoral districts of South Australia
1857 establishments in Australia
1902 disestablishments in Australia
1938 establishments in Australia
1970 disestablishments in Australia